Nykøbing Sjælland railway station ( or Nykøbing Sjælland Banegård) is the main railway station serving the town of Nykøbing Sjælland on the Odsherred peninsula in northwestern Zealand, Denmark.

Nykøbing Sjælland station is the northern terminus of the Odsherredsbanen branch line from Holbæk to Nykøbing Sjælland. The station opened in 1899 with the opening of the Odsherredsbanen railway line. Its station building was built to designs by the Danish architect Heinrich Wenck. It offers frequent local train services to  operated by the regional railway company Lokaltog with onward connections from Holbæk to the rest of the Danish rail network.

History 

The station opened on 17 May 1899 to serve as northern terminus of the new railway line from Holbæk through the Odsherred peninsula to Nykøbing Sjælland.

Operations 

Architecture 

The original station building from 1899 still exists. It was built to designs by the Danish architect Heinrich Wenck (1851–1936), known for the numerous railway stations he designed across Denmark in his capacity of head architect of the Danish State Railways.

See also
 List of railway stations in Denmark
 Rail transport in Denmark

References

Citations

Bibliography

External links

 Lokaltog – Danish regional railway company operating in the Capital Region and Region Zealand
 Danske Jernbaner – website with information on railway history in Denmark

Nykøbing Sjælland
Railway stations in Region Zealand
Buildings and structures in Odsherred Municipality
Railway stations opened in 1899
1899 establishments in Denmark
Heinrich Wenck railway stations
Railway stations in Denmark opened in the 19th century